Col Bennett (born 12 September 1950) is a retired Australian soccer player. He is member of the Football Federation Australia - Football Hall of Fame.

Playing career

Club career
Bennett played Sutherland in the New South Wales State League in the early 1970s. 70 - 74

APIA 75 - 76

In 1977, he joined the Brisbane Lions for the inaugural season of the National Soccer League on 2 February 1977 for a fee of $7,000. Bennett played every NSL game for the club between 1977 and 1983.

International career
Bennett represented Australia in 32 full international matches and 23 B-international matches, and is designated as Socceroo #239. His first match for Australia was in a B-international against a travelling Legia Warsaw team at the Sydney Sports Ground in February 1975. His full international debut came in August of the same year against China in Melbourne. After being involved in Australia's failed qualification for the 1978 FIFA World Cup, Bennett played his last game for the Socceroos against Greece in June 1978.

Honours
Individual

 Football Federation Australia Hall of Fame - Medal of Excellence - 2003 Inductee
 Coached Nudgee College 1st XI Football Side to the Premiership in 2013–2014

References

1950 births
Living people
Australian soccer players
Australia international soccer players
National Soccer League (Australia) players
Association football defenders
APIA Leichhardt FC players